Rocky Handsome is a 2016 Indian Hindi-language action thriller film directed by Nishikant Kamat, written by Ritesh Shah, and produced by John Abraham under J. A. Entertainment and Sunir Khetrapal under Azure Entertainment respectively.  An official adaptation of the 2010 Korean film The Man from Nowhere, the film stars Abraham and child artist Diya Chalwad while Shruti Haasan, Nathalia Kaur, Kamat, Teddy Maurya and Sharad Kelkar appear in crucial supporting roles. The story follows a mysterious loan agent, who sets out to exact vengeance against a notorious crime syndicate after they kidnap his shady neighbour's eight year-old daughter, with whom he shares a special bond.

The theatrical trailer was released on 4 March 2016, and the film released on 25 March 2016.

Plot 
Kabir Ahlawat lives a quiet life running a pawn shop in Goa, His next-door neighbor is Anna, a drug addict and bar dancer. She lives with her little daughter Naomi, who develops a nurturing relationship with Kabir. Meanwhile, ACP Dilip Sangodkar from the NCB is after Mantoo, a crime boss supported by brothers Kevin Ferriera and Luke Ferriera, who control a mass racket in organ harvesting and drug manufacturing with a professional assassin named Attila. One night, Anna and her accomplice, who is also her boyfriend, steal drugs from Mantoo's henchman Big Show. Anna hides the drugs in a camera she pawns to Kabir. The consignment loss enrages Mantoo, who assigns Kevin and gives 3 days to recover the stolen drugs. Luke and Attila reach Anna's place, where they torture Anna for the camera. However, much to their surprise, Naomi becomes an eyewitness to the brutal torments.

Unwittingly, Anna reveals the location of the drug, as a response to which Big Show enters Kabir's house along with his man Viju Dempo, demanding the camera. Kabir is obliged to hand the camera to Luke when he tells that Naomi and Anna are his captives. Kabir gets a call from Kevin to make a delivery to Mantoo, and promises to release them, if the delivery is successful. He delivers the drugs to Mantoo, where he finds that cops have already raided Mantoo's haven. Mantoo flees, and Kabir chases him, but is arrested by the cops when they find Anna's corpse with all her organs harvested in Kabir's car. Kevin brutally murders Mantoo, claiming all his organs, and becomes the new drug lord. During interrogation, Kabir escapes from the police station. The officers are bewildered by his combat skills and find out he was a former decorated RAW Special Forces soldier, who retired after his pregnant wife Rukshida was killed in stray terrorist gunfire outside a hospital.

Kabir fights with Attila at a nightclub and is shot, but breaks into a medical shop and performs an impromptu surgery. He then continues on his journey. Kabir finds and frees several child slaves in a drug manufacturing plant, and in the process, kills Luke. He tracks down Kevin, who tells that he has had Naomi killed. He shows a container that has what he says are her eyes. Kabir kills all the gang members, including Attila and Kevin. As he prepares to commit suicide out of grief, Naomi emerges. She had been saved by Attila before her eye surgery; he took pity on her because she had been kind to him. The eyes in the container belonged to the gangsters' surgeon, who had been killed by Attila as the latter took to save Naomi. Kabir is arrested, but the officers allow Naomi to ride with him. Kabir asks them to stop at a convenience store, where he buys a backpack and school supplies for Naomi. Kabir asks her if she can manage until he returns, to which she agrees with him and the two embrace.

Cast
 John Abraham as Kabir "Rocky" Ahlawat a.k.a. "Handsome", a former RAW agent and Special Force soldier
 Shruti Haasan in a cameo appearance as Rukshida Ahlawat, Kabir's wife
 Nathalia Kaur as Anna
 Nishikant Kamat as Kevin Ferriera
 Diya Chalwad as Naomi, Anna's daughter who bonds with Kabir
 Sharad Kelkar as Anti-Narcotics Bureau ACP Dilip Sangodkar
 Shiv Kumar Subramaniam as ACP Rebello
 Suhasini Mulay as Carla Aunty, a child trafficker
 Teddy Maurya as Luke Ferriera, Kevin's brother
 Kazu Patrick Tang as Attila, Kevin's henchman
 Uday Tikekar as Mantoo
 Sanjay Khapre as Inspector Pitale
 Gurpreet Saini as Viju Dempo, Kevin's man
 Nora Fatehi in a special appearance in the song "Rock Tha Party"

Production
Haasan was cast as Abraham's wife, while seven-year-old Chalwad, who was first seen in  Kick, plays an important role. Nathalia Kaur, who was seen in the item number Dan Dan Cheeni in Ram Gopal Varma’s Department, plays the mother of the child. "But the theme of our film is the action. We are getting action directors from abroad—Eastern Asia—for the stunts," said Kheterpal.  According to him, the shooting in Hyderabad was for about 45–50 days. While the second schedule was filmed in Goa, the third was in Mumbai.

Release
The film earned  in one day including paid previews in India. The film went down on day two with collections of  crore nett. The film earned  on third day and the film had a very low weekend of  crore nett with  crore nett on paid previews. The collections on Monday were low at around  nett.

Soundtrack

The music for Rocky Handsome has been composed by Sunny Bawra, Inder Bawra, Ankit Tiwari and Bombay Rockers while the lyrics are penned by Kumaar, Manoj Muntashir, Abhendra Kumar Upadhyay, Sachin Pathak, Sagar Lahauri and Shekhar Astitwa. The album contains a total of 7 tracks. The first song, "Rock Tha Party," was released on 15 February 2016. The soundtrack was released on 22 February 2016 which included 6 songs. Later an unplugged version of Alfazon Ki Tarah was released on 22 March 2016 voiced by Shreya Ghoshal, John Abraham and Ankit Tiwari.

Reception
The film has received negative reviews aimed at its execution of story and script, holding a 0% "Rotten" score on aggregate site Rotten Tomatoes. Sonali Kokra of The National (UAE) gave it a 1/5 rating, stating that "With Rocky Handsome, director Nishikant Kamat completes a hat-trick of poorly made remakes that fail spectacularly to do justice to the originals.". Anupama Chopra of The Hindustan Times gave it 2/5 stars, writing, "Not for a minute did I think that [Abraham] couldn't do the things he was doing. The trouble is that what he's doing isn't very interesting – especially if you’ve seen the original film. [...] Way too much time and effort is spent showcasing the leading man – John's body is a no-carb miracle and Kamat fetishises it.".

However, other critics were more appreciative of the film, namely praising its action sequences and Abraham's physicality. Subhash K. Jha rated the film 4/5, writing "It would have to be a toss-up between Shoojit Sircar's excellent political thriller Madras Café and now Nishikant Kamat's Rocky Handsome." Bollywood Hungama rated the film 3.5/5, writing, "On the whole, ROCKY HANDSOME is for people who like action films. Despite the film having a simple plot, it has been garnished with engrossing drama and action stunningly. One can find the right mix of tension, action, emotion under one roof. A well-made action thriller."

References

External links
 
 
 

2016 action thriller films
2016 films
2010s Hindi-language films
Films scored by Ankit Tiwari
Indian detective films
Indian action thriller films
Films about organised crime in India
Films about organ trafficking
Films about drugs
Indian remakes of South Korean films
Films with screenplays by Ritesh Shah
Indian pregnancy films
Films set in Goa
Films shot at Ramoji Film City
Films shot in Goa
Films shot in Mumbai
Films shot in Hyderabad, India
Indian films about revenge
T-Series (company) films
Films directed by Nishikant Kamat
Films about the Narcotics Control Bureau